The Toka Gorge is a river gorge in Kvam, Norway. The gorge lies west of the village of Norheimsund in Hordaland county.

The gorge is traversed by Norwegian County Road 7, which was laid out around 1890, started being built in 1903, and it was opened in 1907. Large parts of the road were built by hand while workers hung on ropes against the sheer mountainside. A new route with four tunnels was built between 1953 and 1956. In 2009 the Norwegian Directorate for Cultural Heritage protected the old road as part of the National Protection Plan for Roads, Bridges, and Road-Related Cultural Heritage.

The name Tokagjelet comes from Old Norse tǫk, the plural of tak 'grip, hold' plus gjel 'gorge, ravine' (< Old Norse gil), and is suffixed with the definite article -et.

References

External links
Toka Gorge at Encyclopaedia Britannica

Canyons and gorges of Norway
Cultural heritage of Norway
Kvam